Filge can refer to:

FILe Generator and Editor
Filge, a fictional character in the World of Greyhawk campaign setting for the Dungeons & Dragons role-playing game